The 2005 Peace Cup was the second competition of the Peace Cup. The eight invited teams were split into two groups, and two group winners advanced to the final. Tottenham Hotspur became champions after defeating Lyon 3–1 in the final.

Teams

Venues

Group stage

Group A

Group B

Final

Goalscorers

References

External links 
 RSSSF

2005
2005
2005 in South Korean football
2005 in Colombian football
2005–06 in French football
2005–06 in Argentine football
2005–06 in English football
2005–06 in South African soccer
2005–06 in Spanish football
2005–06 in Dutch football